Thomasia macrocarpa, commonly known as large-fruited thomasia, is a  shrub that is endemic to the southwest of Western Australia.

Description
The leaves are heart to egg-shaped, velvety when young and become smooth as they age. The conspicuous pink to purple flowers are produced between August and November in the species' native range. Occasionally white flowers are seen. The flower petals are small lobes and the surface is covered in star-shaped hairs. The flowers are followed by capsules containing black seeds which are shed from the plant when ripe.

Taxonomy and naming
Thomasia macrocarpa was first formally described by Austrian botanist Stephan Endlicher in 1839 based on a horticultural specimen, and published the description in Novarum Stirpium Decades. The specific epithet (macrocarpa) means "long- or large-fruited".

Distribution and habitat
Large-fruited thomasia usually grows in damp places near creeks or in well-drained soil in shady places and is found on and near the Darling Scarp from Glen Forrest to Canning Dam, with an outlier further south near Cowaramup, in the Jarrah Forest, Swan Coastal Plain and Warren bioregions of south-western Western Australia.

Conservation status
This thomasia is listed as "not threatened" by the Government of Western Australia Department of Biodiversity, Conservation and Attractions.

References

macrocarpa
Rosids of Western Australia
Plants described in 1839
Taxa named by Stephan Endlicher